Bo-Göran "Bosse" Larsson (born 5 May 1944) is a Swedish former professional footballer who played as a midfielder and striker. Best remembered for his time with Malmö FF, he also represented VfB Stuttgart and Trelleborgs FF during his career. A full international between 1964 and 1978, he won 70 caps for the Sweden national team and scored 17 goals. He also represented Sweden at the 1970, 1974, and 1978 FIFA World Cups.

Club career
Most of his club career he played for Malmö FF where he won the league championship several times. Between 1966 and 1969 he was an appreciated professional for VfB Stuttgart scoring 21 times in 88 games. As the best player in the team and loved by the supporters he was also awarded "Athlete of the Year" in 1969 by the city of Stuttgart. According to many he had a by far too short career as a professional player, but his wife Anita never settled to life in Germany, which made him move back home to Malmö that same summer.

He was awarded with Guldbollen (the golden ball) in 1965 and 1973, and was the first to be awarded twice. In Malmö FF and among its supporters Bosse holds an iconic status and is regarded as the club's greatest player ever.

International career
Bosse Larsson was one of the national team profiles during the 1970s. In total he got 70 caps, scoring 17 times, and played at the 1970 FIFA World Cup, 1974 FIFA World Cup and 1978 FIFA World Cup.
The Sweden national team manager Georg "Åby" Ericson used to say that; "When picking a Swedish national squad you start by picking Bosse Larsson, then you start thinking about which other players to pick". Beside Nils Liedholm, Bosse Larsson is regarded as Sweden's most complete player ever, being able to actually play at almost any position on the pitch.

Personal life
Today he lives a quiet life in Malmö. In September 2007 a book titled "Bosse Larsson" was released. The book, written by Jonny Ambrius together with Bosse (who finally after many years had decided to take part in a book being made), is filled with stories from the whole of Bosse's life, but with the centre of gravity on his footballer years. Shortly after the book release he also gave his permission for a possible statue to be made in his honour and placed outside Malmö FF's new stadium.

Career statistics

International 

 Scores and results list Sweden's goal tally first, score column indicates score after each Larsson goal.

Honours
Malmö FF
Allsvenskan: 1965, 1970, 1971, 1974, 1975, 1977
Svenska Cupen: 1973, 1974, 1975, 1978
Trelleborgs FF

 Division 3 Skåne: 1980
Individual
 Allsvenskan top scorer: 1963 (17 goals), 1965 (28 goals), 1970 (16 goals)

 Guldbollen (Swedish Footballer of the Year): 1965, 1973 (the first to be awarded twice)
 Stor Grabb: 1968
 Best footballer of the Bundesliga: 1968–69
 Athlete of the Year by the city of Stuttgart: 1969
 2005 Swedish Football Association Hall of Fame inductee
 Honorary member of Malmö FF

Records

 Most goal scorer of Malmö FF: 119 goals (307 games)

References

External links

1944 births
Living people
Swedish expatriate footballers
Expatriate footballers in Germany
Swedish expatriate sportspeople in Germany
Swedish footballers
Footballers from Skåne County
Sweden international footballers
VfB Stuttgart players
Malmö FF players
1970 FIFA World Cup players
1974 FIFA World Cup players
1978 FIFA World Cup players
Trelleborgs FF players
Allsvenskan players
Bundesliga players
Association football midfielders
Association football forwards